Russell Ward (born March 8, 1992) is an American racing driver who currently competes in the IMSA SportsCar Championship for HTP Winward Motorsport. Ward also serves as Winward Racing's team principal.

Career
Ward began his racing career in 2016 following several years competing in various track days alongside the ChampCar Endurance Series and 24 Hours of Lemons. For 2016, he embarked on a full season campaign in the Pirelli GT3 Cup Trophy USA with Kelly-Moss Road and Race, taking a podium finish in the final round at Circuit of the Americas. For 2017, Ward made his debut in the Continental Tire SportsCar Challenge, pairing with Damien Faulkner in a GS-class Porsche Cayman GT4 Clubsport fielded by CJ Wilson Racing. In the duo's opening race at Daytona, they finished third in the Grand Sport class; Ward's first podium in IMSA-sanctioned competition. Through ten races that season, Ward and Faulkner captured just the one podium, finishing 8th in the Grand Sport classification.

2018 saw Ward take part in a variety of series, with a particular focus on the Continental Tire SportsCar Challenge. Near the end of 2017, Winward joined forces with HTP Motorsport, paving the way for the team's transition to Mercedes-AMG machinery for 2018. Driving alongside Faulkner once again, the team claimed one podium through eight races, finishing 20th in the GS class standings. Ward also made one-off appearances in the Blancpain GT Series Asia, claiming a class victory and a podium finish, as well as the Pirelli World Challenge, International GT Open, DMV Gran Turismo Touring Car Cup, and 24H Series. In 2019, Ward scored his first victory in the renamed Michelin Pilot Challenge, pairing with Mercedes-AMG factory driver Dominik Baumann in the penultimate round of the season at Laguna Seca. Ward had missed the round at Road America following a crash in practice, relegating him to 16th in the overall standings. Two races in the 24H Series and a select few races in the International GT Open accompanied Ward's primary commitment in IMSA for 2019.

With Winward Racing's merger with HTP Motorsport at the end of 2019, Ward was set for a wide variety of racing opportunities in 2020. Launching another full-season campaign in the Michelin Pilot Challenge, Ward collected a pair of podiums, alongside his first pole position in the series at VIR, en route to his best ever points finish in the championship. Ward also took part in a part-time campaign in the GT World Challenge America, starting in the Pro/Am class with his father, Bryce, before jumping into the Silver Cup class for the rounds at Road America and Circuit of the Americas. Despite making just four starts in the Silver Cup, the lack of entries meant Ward was scored second in the season-long class championship. Ward also made his debut at the 24 Hours of Spa in October, taking second in the Silver Cup class alongside co-drivers Indy Dontje and Philip Ellis.

Ward began 2021 with his debut in the IMSA SportsCar Championship, joining Maro Engel, Indy Dontje, and Philip Ellis in the team's Mercedes-AMG GT3 Evo. In the team's first ever race in the championship, the 2021 24 Hours of Daytona, the quartet claimed class victory, taking Mercedes-AMG's first ever GTD class victory at the 24 Hours of Daytona. Ward also took part in a full-season effort for the 2021 GT World Challenge America, alongside a rotating driver lineup of Ellis and Mikaël Grenier. Grenier and Ward claimed the entry's sole race victory of the season, taking overall honors in the second race at VIR. Eight podium finishes was only enough to see Ward finish fourth in the Pro class championship, six points adrift of the Turner Motorsport duo of Robby Foley and Michael Dinan in third. A full-season effort in the GT World Challenge Europe Endurance Cup also featured in Ward's driving lineup, in which he claimed one podium through five races in the Silver Cup. As a result of his extensive exploits in Mercedes-AMG machinery during the 2021 calendar year, he was deemed the winner of the Pro-Driver GT3 category of the marque's brand-internal customer racing championship.

In October 2021, Ward announced Winward's plans to conduct a full-season campaign in the IMSA SportsCar Championship for 2022. After a slow start to the season, which included finishes outside of the top ten at Sebring, Long Beach, and Laguna Seca, the team initially believed that they'd claimed victory at Watkins Glen in June. However, the team ran afoul of IMSA's drive time restrictions and were demoted to 11th in class. The team suffered another near miss at Lime Rock, suffering a fuel pump failure on the final lap while leading. However, following three podiums in four races, two of which were back-to-back victories at Road America and Virginia International Raceway, the team entered the final round with an outside chance at scoring the GTD class championship. However, after an 11th-place finish at Petit Le Mans, Ward and season-long co-driver Philip Ellis settled for fifth in the points classification. 

Ward complemented his IMSA endeavors with a part-time drive in the GT World Challenge America. After claiming a class victory at Watkins Glen, Ward and Ellis swept the weekend at Road America, marking three race victories in a row. At the end of 2022, Ward won Mercedes-AMG's Pro-Driver GT3 award, given to the most successful FIA-Platinum, Gold, or Silver rated driver in Mercedes-AMG's GT3 machinery over the course of the calendar year.

2023 saw Ward return full-time to the GT World Challenge Europe Endurance Cup, joining Ellis and Dontje in one of the team's two Gold Cup entries.

Racing record

Career summary

Complete GT World Challenge Europe Endurance Cup results

Complete IMSA SportsCar Championship results
(key) (Races in bold indicate pole position)

References

External links
Russell Ward at Speedsport Magazine

1989 births
Living people
American racing drivers
24H Series drivers
Blancpain Endurance Series drivers
International GT Open drivers
24 Hours of Spa drivers
WeatherTech SportsCar Championship drivers
24 Hours of Daytona drivers
GT World Challenge America drivers
Mercedes-AMG Motorsport drivers
Michelin Pilot Challenge drivers